Edaganathar Temple (ஏடகநாதர் கோயில்)  is a Hindu temple dedicated to the deity Shiva, located in Thiruvedagam, a village in Madurai district in the South Indian state of Tamil Nadu. The temple is located on the banks of Vaigai River. Shiva is worshipped as Edaganathar, and is represented by the lingam. His consort Parvati is depicted as Visalakshi. The presiding deity is revered in the 7th century Tamil Saiva canonical work, the Tevaram, written by Tamil saint poets known as the nayanars and classified as Paadal Petra Sthalam.

The temple complex covers five acres and it houses two gateway towers known as gopurams, each facing the Edaganathar and Elavrkuzhali shrine. The temple has a number of shrines, with those of Edaganathar and his consort being the most prominent.

The temple has six daily rituals at various times from 6:00 a.m. to 8:30 p.m., and four yearly festivals on its calendar. The Muthu Pandal festival is celebrated during the day of the Magam (February – March) is the most prominent festival.

The original complex is believed to have been built by Pandyan Empire, while the present masonry structure was built during the Nayak during the 16th century. In modern times, the temple is maintained and administered by the Hindu Religious and Charitable Endowments Department of the Government of Tamil Nadu.

Legend

As per Hindu legend, Jainism was the most prominent religion in the region. Sambandar challenged the Jainist scholars to compete against him. As per the rules of the competition, the scholars had to write their verses in palm leaf, float them in the river and the winner is decided when the leaf floated, while the lower work sunk. Sambandar's verses on a palm leaf (Edu) is said to have gone against the current of Vaigai and settled here, as opposed to the leaf floated by the once dominant Jains here, hence the name Tiruvedakam. It is believed that Shiva appeared at the place as Eduganathar, the one who let the leaf float. Vaaduvenra Vinaayakar here is said to have stopped the movement of the palm leaf  in the guise of a fish, in response to Sambandar's patikam. Shiva here is believed to have been worshipped by Garuda, Adiseshan and Vishnu. As per local legend, the place was called Cetanur as Adisesha, the serpent snake of Vishnu worshipped Shiva and later went on the become Edakam.

Architecture
The temple is located on the Madurai – cholavandan bus route and the nearest railway station is cholavandan. Images related to Sambandars episode are seen carved on the stone steps leading to the Vaikai river. The presiding deity lord shiva is called as Edakanatheswarar and the Ambal his consort mother Parvathy is called as Elavaarkuzhali, Sugandha Kundalambika. The sthala vriksham is Vilvam(Aegle marmelos) and the Theertham is called Bhrama Theertham. Inscriptions from the period of Jatavarman Kulasekhara Pandyan (12th century AD), and Krishna Deva Raya are seen in this temple, speaking of their endowments to this shrine. As per tradition, a Pandyan queen wanted Sambandar to reconvert the king Arikesari Nedumaran to Saivism from his Jain beliefs. Sambandar accepted the plea of the queen and influenced the king to convert to Saivism. It is also believed that the king slayed around 8,000 Jains in his kingdom. The stone carvings in the temple narrate the tradition.

Worship, religious practises and literary mention

The temple priests perform the puja (rituals) during festivals and on a daily basis. The temple rituals are performed six times a day; Kalasanthi at 6:00 a.m., Irandam Kalm at 9:00 a.m., Uchikalam at 12:00 a.m., Sayarakshai at 6:00 p.m,  Irandam Kalm at 7:30 p.m., and Arthajamam at 9:00 p.m.. Each ritual comprises four steps: abhisheka (sacred bath), alangaram (decoration), naivethanam (food offering) and deepa aradanai (waving of lamps) for Edaganathar and Elavrkuzhali. Sambandar's miracle is celebrated every year as Edu Ethireriya Utsavam during the Tamil month of Vaikasi. Other festivals include Vinayaka Chaturthi, Aadi Pooram, Navaratri, Aippasi Pournami, Skanda Sashti, Kartikai Deepam, Arudra Darisanam, Tai Poosam, Maasi Magam, Panguni Uththiram and Vaikasi Visakam. During the Edu Ethireriya Utsavam, the act of Sambandar is reenacted in the temple. Sankabisheka, performed during Karthikai (November – December) is considered very sacred in the region.

It is one of the shrines of the 275 Paadal Petra Sthalams – Shiva Sthalams glorified in the early medieval Tevaram poems by Tamil Saivite Nayanar Sambandar.  Thirupugazh, the work of Arunagirinathar, a 13th-century saint glorifies the temple.

References

External links

 https://web.archive.org/web/20090423062653/http://www.shivatemples.com/pnaadu/pn04.html
 http://www.templenet.com/Tamilnadu/s049.html

Hindu temples in Madurai
Tourist attractions in Madurai
Padal Petra Stalam